Horcas is a heavy metal band from Argentina created in 1988 by Osvaldo Civile, former guitarist for V8, Argentina’s landmark heavy metal outfit of the 1980s. After quitting V8 in 1985, and impressed by the new generation of thrash metal bands from the Bay Area led by Metallica, Civile set out to put together a new group in that style. That project, which included former V8 bandmate Gustavo Rowek on the drums, was however delayed for a number of reasons, and it was not until 1988 that it could definitely take off. By that time though, put off by the incessant postponements, Rowek had joined another former V8 member, Walter Giardino, in his new project Rata Blanca.

History

1988 - 1990 - Reinará la Tempestad 
The first version of Horcas had Civile on lead guitar, Adrián Zucchi on rhythm, Eddie Walker on bass, Gabriel Ganzo on drums and Hugo Benítez on vocals. The band quickly garnered recognition in local heavy metal circles, mainly because of Civile’s past as a V8 member, but also because they were among the first in Argentina to explore a more extreme style within the genre. In 1990, Horcas landed their first recording deal with indie label Radio Trípoli, and as a quartet, since Zucchi had left the band, cut their first album Reinará la Tempestad.

1991 - 1996 - Oíd Mortales el Grito Sangrado 
In 1991, bassist Eddie Walker left the band and was replaced by current member Norberto “Topo” Yáñez, while the rhythm guitar slot was filled by Oscar Castro. With this line-up they released in 1992 their second effort Oíd Mortales el Grito Sangrado ("Hear, oh mortals, the bleeding cry", a twist on the opening line of the Argentine Anthem: "Oíd mortales el grito sagrado" -"Hear, oh mortals, the sacred cry"-). This album, which includes the track "Solución Suicida", broadened the band’s fanbase and seemed to predict a major breakthrough for Horcas in the near future. In fact, during 1993, the band was chosen to open for Metallica, Motörhead, Kreator and Exodus on their Argentinian dates. However, there were soon to be internal frictions, which ended up in Civile firing all of the band members except for bassist Topo Yáñez, in less than a year. This situation, which forced Civile to reform the band almost from scratch, together with major problems with their label, which prevented Horcas from recording for 5 years, seriously hampered the band’s growth.

1997 - 1999 - Vence - Eternos - Civile's death 
However, Civile continued with Horcas despite these problems. This fact, along with the devotion his persona inspired in the local heavy metal fanbase, opened the band a new window of opportunity in 1997, when, with a new line-up which included current members Sebastián Coria on guitar, Guillermo De Luca on drums and Walter Meza on vocals, Horcas were able to finally record their third album Vence. The album, which yielded the track "Argentina, Tus Hijos" - also to be the band's first video clip - was acclaimed by critics and fans alike, and Horcas were once again active. 1997 and 1998 were extremely successful years for Horcas during which the band expanded their fanbase and finally established themselves as one of the leading Argentinian and Latin American heavy metal acts. At that time Civile is quoted as saying that after 7 years he had finally put together the band he had strived so many years for.

At the beginning of 1999, Horcas returned to the studio to cut its fourth album Eternos, which was to become Civile’s last recording. On April 24, 1999 Civile played with Horcas for the last time. Five days later, on April 29 he was found shot dead in his home. The cause of his death was ultimately never clarified, though speculation points to suicide, since Civile had a long history of alcohol addiction and was said to be prone to depressive attacks.

1999 - 2003 - Horcas - Vive 
The remaining band members were then faced with the dilemma of continuing with the band or not. Finally it was decided that Horcas would continue as a tribute to Civile, although it was not the same and the band is currently facing charges for illegally using the name "Horcas". The band was thinking of renaming themselves.The band then enlisted guitarist Gabriel Lis and went on their first international tour that included Mexico, Bolivia, Uruguay and Brazil to promote Eternos. 

In 2002 Horcas were signed by indie label El Pie Records and recorded their fifth studio album, the first without Osvaldo Civile. The album called simply Horcas was extremely well received both by critics and fans and yielded such songs as "Esperanza" and "Reacción". The next year, the band released their first live album Vive, recorded on September 13, 2003 during a sold-out gig at Hangar in Buenos Aires.

2004 - 2006 - Demencial 
2004 was a turning point in Horcas’ career. The year began with the band opening for Iron Maiden at José Amalfitani Stadium in Buenos Aires for an audience of 40,000. Shortly after, they changed management and touring became more extensive on a national scale and began to include international dates on a regular basis. On November 18, 2004, Horcas released Demencial, their final album for El Pie Records. The album, which inaugurated an era of experimentation for the band, in which they work with lower tunings and new sounds, received excellent reviews from the critics and a mixed reaction from their fanbase, who stayed loyal for the most part. 

During the “Demencial Tour”, which began on December 18, 2004 in Buenos Aires at a sold-out El Teatro, Horcas toured Argentina, Ecuador, Venezuela, Uruguay and Colombia where they headlined the second stage of Rock al Parque Festival in Bogotá on October 14, 2006. Also for the first time in their career they performed outside Latin America: on April 30, 2006, Horcas played at Viña Rock Festival in Spain.

2006 - 2008 - Asesino 
In 2006 Horcas were signed by SoyRock/TockaDiscos – Sony BMG, their first contract with a major label. Under this deal they released on October 26, 2006 their eighth album Asesino, which took experimentation a step further. This album has a significantly darker tone than any of its predecessors and received mixed reviews. However, the “Asesino Tour” 2007-2008 was extremely successful with almost 100 dates which included a slot in the Vive Latino festival in Santiago, Chile on April 15, 2007 and opening for Megadeth in Buenos Aires in May, 2008.

2008 - 2012- Reviviendo Huestes / 20th anniversary Live CD and DVD 
On October 16, 2008 Horcas released their ninth album Reviviendo Huestes. With a title that recalls the name of the song "Reviviendo las Huestes" included on their first album, Horcas seemed to suggest a return to the roots with a remake of their track "Solución Suicida" which closes the album. 

During 2009 and 2010 Horcas hit the road with the "RH Tour", which included opening gigs for Iron Maiden on March 28, 2009 at José Amalfitani Stadium for an audience of 40,000, and for Metallica on January 21, 2010 at River Plate stadium for a crowd of 60,000. On May 15, 2010 Horcas recorded their tenth album and first DVD live at a sold-out Teatro Colegiales in Buenos Aires as part of a series of events to take place throughout 2010 in celebration of their 20th anniversary. On December 6, 2010 Horcas released their tenth album and first DVD under the title of La Maldición Continúa. The release is available in two formats: Standard (only CD) and Full (CD + DVD). At the beginning of 2011 Horcas took to the road with their new "Maldición Tour".

2012 - present - Por Tu Honor, Gritando Verdades and Line-up changes
In 2012, Gabriel Lis left the band and was replaced by Lucas Simcic. In 2013 with Simcic the band released the album Por Tu Honor. Drummer Guillermo DeLucca left Horcas in 2016 being replaced by Mariano Elias Martin. In 2018 they published their most recent album Gritando Verdades. During the pandemic period for Covid-19 Martin and Simcic left the band. The band recruited Cristian Romero (drums) and Lucas Bravo (guitars) both also members of heavy metal band Morthifera.

Members

Current members
Topo Yáñez - bass  (1991 - present)
Sebastián Coria - guitar  (1994 - present)
Lucas Bravo - guitar  (2021 - present)
Walter Meza - vocals  (1997 - present)
Cristian Romero - drums (2020-present)

Former Members
Guitar
Osvaldo Civile (1986–1999) - (V8, Té de Brujas)
Adrian Zucchi (1989) - (Motor V, Traidor)
Claudio "Yankee" Ortiz - (1990)
Oscar Castro (1991–1993) - (Lethal, Legion, Existencia, Azeroth, Bizarro)
Gabriel Lis (1999-2011)
Lucas Simcic (2012 - 2021)
Silvio Salerno (1987-1988) 
Bass
Marcelo Dogo - (1986-1988)
Eddie Walker (1989–1991) - (Lethal, Razones Concientes, Motor V, Existencia)

Drums
Gabriel Ganzo (1986–1993) - (El Dragon, Razones Concientes, Res.ca.te, Existencia)
Marcelo Bartolozzi - (1994)
Guillermo De Luca - (1995-2016)
Mariano Elias Martin - (2016 - 2020)

Vocals
Sergio Cives - (1986)
Carlos Perigo (1988) - (Predador, Rata Blanca, Heinkel, Wizard)
Hugo Benítez (1986–1988, 1998-1993) - (Metralla, Letal, Motorman, Existencia)
Christian Bertoncelli (1995–1997) - (Imperio, Bajel, Renacer, Azeroth)

Timeline

Albums
 Reinará la tempestad - 1990
 Oíd mortales el grito sangrado - 1992
 Vence - 1997
 Eternos - 1999
 Horcas - 2002
 Vive - 2003
 Demencial - 2004
 Asesino - 2006
 Reviviendo Huestes - 2008
 La Maldición Continúa - 2010
 Por tu Honor - 2013
 Gritando Verdades - 2018

References

External links
 
 Horcas' Biography at rock.com.ar

Argentine thrash metal musical groups
Musical groups established in 1988
Musical quintets
Musical groups from Buenos Aires